Silverburn (also known as Pollok Town Centre or The Centre) is an out-of-town shopping centre located on Barrhead Road in Pollok, Glasgow, Scotland. The development replaces the  Pollok centre with a brand new  shopping centre, anchored by Tesco, Next, Marks & Spencer and previously Debenhams before it closed in 2021.

History
Built on land that was previously the Pollok Centre dating from the late 1970s, which itself replaced an unsuccessful development of tenement housing from the 1940s the completed Silverburn opened for the first time on Thursday 25 October 2007, designed by BDP (architects), Stuart McTaggart (civil and structural engineers) and constructed by Bovis Lend Lease. The largest Scottish Tesco Extra had opened on 10 July 2006 at the site, replacing the Tesco store in the old Pollok Centre. It has been said that the name "Silverburn" evolved from a local consultation, as the Brock Burn which lies west of the site (with footbridges connecting to the Househillwood and Priesthill neighbourhoods) was famous for containing large quantities of shopping trolleys from the previous Tesco store and this is where the 'silver glint' came from; the practice of abandoning trollies has continued.

Developed by Retail Property Holdings Ltd (RPH) to house 95 shopping units and 14 restaurants and cafes, it is one of the largest shopping centres in the UK. It includes  of retail and leisure space, 2000 parking spaces in a multi-storey car park, and 2500 spaces on the ground. In 2009, the centre was sold to Hammerson for £300 million.

Silverburn is Glasgow's fifth out-of-town shopping centre. Being located right next to the M77 motorway it is easily accessible to people coming from Paisley or East Renfrewshire.

It was named the "UK's best shopping centre" in 2019, the latest of several awards since its opening.

Expansion
In 2013, a programme of expansion of the centre was begun, to include a Cineworld cinema and nine new restaurants, completed in stages between late 2014 and mid 2015.

After a proposal in 2014 to extend the centre over its current car parking area, further plans for expansion were proposed in October 2015, with the intention to expand over the other side of the M77 with further shopping and leisure features, a hotel, and a community centre.

A Silverburn mascot, a fox named Silvia, was introduced in 2018 following a competition between local primary school children.

Incidents

References

Shopping centres in Glasgow
Shopping malls established in 2007
2007 establishments in Scotland